The Calcare di Bari (Italian for Bari Limestone) is a Cretaceous (Valanginian to early Turonian, spanning approximately 45 million years) geologic formation in Apulia, southeastern Italy. The formation comprises micritic limestones, in places karstified and dolomitized.

Description 
The Calcare di Bari underlies the Calcare di Altamura, separated by an unconformity. The base of the formation is not recognized in outcrop. The Calcare di Bari is subdivided into the Avvantaggio, Montericco, Palorbitoline, Corato, Bisceglie and Sannicandro Members. The formation crops out around the Bari–Taranto railway.

The formation comprises micritic and dolomitic limestones containing foraminifera with several levels of rudists. The depositional environment of the formation has been interpreted as inner platform with tidal and lagoonal influence.

From the Valanginian to the early Aptian the present region of Apulia was dominated by a very shallow carbonate platform characterized by tranquil waters, evidenced by the muddy to marly limestones. Deepening occurred in the upper part of the formation with subtidal deposits containing a rudist reefal fauna.

The upper part of the formation is dated to the Cenomanian based on the presence of the microfossils Sauvagesia sharpei, Chrysalidina gradata, Pseudolituonella reicheli, Pseudorhapydionina dubia, Nummofallotia apula, Nezzazata sp. and algae Heteroporella lepina. The uppermost part is dated to the early Turonian.

Fossil content 
The formation has provided ichnofossils of:
 Ankylosauria indet.
 Sauropoda indet.
 Theropoda indet.

Foraminifera
 Miliolidae indet.

See also 
 List of fossiliferous stratigraphic units in Italy
 List of dinosaur-bearing rock formations
 List of stratigraphic units with ornithischian tracks
 Ankylosaur tracks

References

Bibliography 
 
 
 

Geologic formations of Italy
Cretaceous System of Europe
Cretaceous Italy
Valanginian Stage
Hauterivian Stage
Barremian Stage
Aptian Stage
Albian Stage
Cenomanian Stage
Turonian Stage
Limestone formations
Dolomite formations
Shallow marine deposits
Reef deposits
Ichnofossiliferous formations
Paleontology in Italy
Formations